Inarwa Phulbariya is a village in Khadak Municipality (which is in ward number 10) in Saptari District in the Sagarmatha Zone of South-Eastern Nepal. It is the former Village Development Committee of Nepal. At the time of the 2011 Nepal census, it had a population of 5,403 people living in 1,027 individual households.

References

Populated places in Saptari District
VDCs in Saptari District